Work and Travel USA is a United States Government program that allows foreign university students to travel and work within the United States for several months.   Run by the U.S. Department of State, the program has approximately 100,000 participants  between ages 18 and 30 each year.  Each student is sponsored by an American employer.

Requirements 
All program participants must be proficient in the English language and be able to commit to working for at least three months.  Some foreign students may be able to work for up to five months.  The maximum length of stay is determined by the State Department and is based in part on typical university schedules in each nation.

Participants are issued a J-1 visa.

Program overview

Work 
Candidates do not normally need to have qualification or experience as training will be given at the place of work as necessary. The types of jobs on offer include sales-people, cashiers, hosts and staff in hotels, restaurants or entertainment parks.

Travel 
Applicants may remain in the United States until the end of their exchange program, as specified on form DS-2019. Once a J-1 visitor's program ends, he or she may remain in the United States for an additional 30 days, often referred to as a "grace period", in order to prepare for departure from the country.
 The actual J-1 visa certificate does not specifically document this 30-day post-study/exam "grace period", and consequently some airline counter staff have refused to issue a boarding pass to an embarking student. In particular, when the student's return ticket is departing after the J-1 visa has expired. For example: the return date is the next day after the students last exam.
 If the visitor leaves the United States during these 30 days, the visitor may not re-enter with the J-1 visa.
The minimal and the maximal duration of stay are determined by the specific J-1 category under which an exchange visitor is admitted into the United States.

Agencies 
Agencies are representatives of the student candidates. The agencies are engaged in the search for vacancies with sponsors, will organize the vacancies and prepare the necessary documents for participation. Agencies are also engaged in health and safety issues and are available to help solve any problems which may arise for students during their stay in the USA.

Legal aspects

Work and Travel USA students are subject to the Summer Work Travel Program requirements. The company charges a nominal fee to cover the costs of SEVIS, a program that tracks J-1 visa students and makes their anonymous distribution data publicly available on the J-1 visa website.

In addition to the government requirements, Work and Travel USA students are required to:
 Register their information in SEVIS no later than 10 days after arriving in the USA. It varies by each sponsoring organization.
 Update their SEVIS information within 10 days, if they change address during the time in the USA or if they switch jobs. 
 Check-in every 30 days to maintain active status on the program.

Books
 Viking Travel Croatia, General info for the work and travel in the United States 
 Work and Travel USA 2019
 Viking Travel Montenegro, Work and Travel in examples; Work and Travel (2018)

See also 
 Student exchange program

References 

Student exchange
Cultural organizations based in the United States